James Machir (1764June 25, 1827) was a United States representative from Virginia. Machir was member of the Virginia House of Delegates from 1793 to 1796.  He was elected as a Federalist to the Fifth Congress, having won 45.44% of the vote and defeating fellow Federalist Thomas Wilson and Democratic-Republicans John Mitchell and George Jackson and served from March 4, 1797, to March 3, 1799.  He again served as a member of the Virginia House of Delegates from 1811 to 1813 and from 1818 to 1821.  Machir died on June 25, 1827.

References

1764 births
1827 deaths
Federalist Party members of the United States House of Representatives from Virginia
Members of the Virginia House of Delegates
18th-century American politicians
19th-century American politicians